Pawn Shoppe Heart is the major-label debut of American garage rock revival band The Von Bondies, and their second album, released in 2004.

The record was met with critical acclaim, and helped lend even further voice to the Detroit garage punk underground brought to mainstream success by The White Stripes two years prior. The record has an average score of 80/100 on Metacritic. On the last track, after the three-minute silence following "Pawn Shoppe Heart", there's a hidden track: a cover of "Try a Little Tenderness", a song made popular by Otis Redding.

A shortened version of "C'mon C'mon" is the theme song for the American comedy-drama television show, Rescue Me. It is featured on the video games Burnout 3: Takedown and MVP Baseball 2004. The track "Mairead" is about Queens of Noize DJ Mairead Nash, who has been associated with Jason Stollsteimer. MLB Network uses a brief clip of "C'mon C'mon" as the opening of their show 30 Clubs in 30 Days. "C'mon C'mon" was also released as downloadable content for Rock Band and Rock Band 2 on March 31, 2009 for Xbox 360 and April 2, 2009 for PS3. This track became available as DLC for the Wii version of Rock Band 2 on April 7, 2009 for $2 (200 Wii Points).

Track listing
All songs written by Jason Stollsteimer except where noted. 
"No Regrets" – 2:34
"Broken Man" – 2:10
"C'mon C'mon" – 2:15  	
"Tell Me What You See" – 1:56 	  	
"Been Swank" – 2:44
"Mairead" – 5:11
"Not That Social" – 3:01	  	
"Crawl Through the Darkness" – 2:45	  	
"The Fever" (Jason Stollsteimer, Don Blum) – 2:38
"Right of Way" – 3:46	  	
"Poison Ivy" – 2:14
"Pawn Shoppe Heart" / "Try a Little Tenderness" (Stollsteimer, Irving King, Harry M. Woods) – 9:28

Charts

References

2004 albums
The Von Bondies albums
Sire Records albums
Albums produced by Jerry Harrison